Abdullah Jaroudi Sr. (born 1909, date of death unknown) was a Lebanese sports shooter. He competed in the 50 m rifle, prone event at the 1952 Summer Olympics. His son competed at the 1960 Summer Olympics.

References

External links

1909 births
Year of death missing
Lebanese male sport shooters
Olympic shooters of Lebanon
Shooters at the 1952 Summer Olympics
Place of birth missing